The 2021 Women's South American Volleyball Championship was the 34th edition of the Women's South American Volleyball Championship held in Barrancabermeja, Colombia and organised by South America's governing volleyball body, the Confederación Sudamericana de Voleibol (CSV). The champion and first runner-ups will qualify for the 2022 FIVB Volleyball Women's World Championship.

Competing nations
The following national teams participated:

 (Hosts)

Venues

Pool standing procedure
 Number of matches won
 Match points
 Sets ratio
 Points ratio
 If the tie continues as per the point ratio between two teams, the priority will be given to the team which won the last match between them. When the tie in points ratio is between three or more teams, a new classification of these teams in the terms of points 1, 2 and 3 will be made taking into consideration only the matches in which they were opposed to each other.

Match won 3–0 or 3–1: 3 match points for the winner, 0 match points for the loser
Match won 3–2: 2 match points for the winner, 1 match point for the loser

Round robin
All times are Colombia Time (UTC−05:00).

|}

Final standing

Awards

Most Valuable Player
 Gabriela Guimarães
Best Setter
 Maria Alejandra Marín
Best Outside Spikers
 Amanda Coneo
 Daniela Bulaich
Best Middle Blockers
 Yeisy Soto
 Ana Carolina da Silva
Best Opposite Spiker
 Ana Cristina de Souza
Best Libero
 Tatiana Rizzo

See also

 South American Men's Volleyball Championship
 Women's U22 South American Volleyball Championship
 Women's Junior South American Volleyball Championship
 Girls' Youth South American Volleyball Championship
 Girls' U16 South American Volleyball Championship
 Volleyball at the Pan American Games
 Men's Pan-American Volleyball Cup
 Women's Pan-American Volleyball Cup

References

External links
Official website

Women's South American Volleyball Championships
South American Volleyball Championship
International volleyball competitions hosted by Colombia
2021 in South American sport
South American Volleyball Championship
September 2021 sports events in South America